Kummannoor is a small village in the Pathanamthitta district, located 5 km from Konni and 15 km from district headquarters.

Location
Kummannoor is located near the Konni reserve forest and the main attraction is the Achankovil river.

Airport
The nearest airport is the Trivandrum International airport which is 100 km away.

Access
The nearest bus station is Konni Ksrtc and Pathanamthitta.

References

Villages in Pathanamthitta district